Anxious is an American emo band from Fairfield, Connecticut. The band is currently signed to Run for Cover Records. The band released their debut album in 2022 titled Little Green House. The album was named Stereogum's "Album of the Week". The album received positive reviews.

Members

Current Members 

 Grady Allen - vocals (2016-current); guitar (2016-2019)
 Sam Allen - bass (2021-current)
 Jonny Camner - drums (2019-current)
 Dante Melucci - guitar, vocals (2019-current); drums (2017-2019)
 Tommy Harte - guitar (2022-current); touring (2021-2022)

Former Members 

 Sam Walter - bass, vocals (2016-2020)
 Ryan Savitsky - guitar (2019-2021)
 Ross Thompson - bass (2019-2020)
 Michelle Siegel - drums (2016)

Discography
Studio albums
Little Green House (2022, Run For Cover)

EPs 

 Carved (2017, self-released)
 Promo 2019 (2019, Triple-B Records)
 Never Better (2019, Triple-B Records)

Singles 

 "New Shapes" (2021, Triple-B Records)
 "The Long Spring" (2021, Triple-B Records)
 "Call From You" (2021, Run for Cover)
 "Sunsign" (2022, Run for Cover)
 "Where You Been" (2022, Run for Cover)

References

American emo musical groups
Musical groups from Connecticut
Run for Cover Records artists
21st-century American musicians